Nayomi Munaweera is a Sri Lankan American writer and author of Island of a Thousand Mirrors, which won Commonwealth Book Prize for the Asian Region in 2013, and What Lies Between Us (2016), which won the Sri Lankan National Book Award for best English novel and the Godage Award.

Biography
Nayomi Munaweera was born in Sri Lanka in 1973. Her family moved to Nigeria when she was three. In 1984, there was a military coup in Nigeria and her family moved again, this time to Los Angeles. She holds bachelor's degree in Literature from the University of California, Irvine and a master's degree in South Asian Literature from the University of California, Riverside. Munaweera now lives in Oakland and teaches at Mills College and Ashland University.

Island of a Thousand Mirrors was her debut novel and was published in South Asia in 2012. It went on to be nominated for many of the sub-continent's major literary prizes including Man Asian Literary Prize and won the Commonwealth Regional Prize for Asia in 2013. It was long listed for the International DUBLIN Literary Award and short listed for the DSC Prize for South Asian Literature. The novel was released in America by St. Martin's Press in 2014. It tells the story of the conflict  between two main ethnic groups in Sri Lanka from the perspective of two girls who witness the horror. The civil war officially began in 1983 and continued until 2009.

Works
 Island of a Thousand Mirrors, Colombo: Perera Hussein Pub. House, ; New York: St. Martin's Griffin Press, 2016. 
 What Lies Between Us New York: St. Martin's Griffin, 2016.

References

External links 

Sri Lankan novelists
Sri Lankan emigrants to the United States
Living people
University of California, Irvine alumni
University of California, Riverside alumni
Sinhalese writers
American novelists of Asian descent
Munaweera
1973 births